Fiane may refer to:

Places
Fiane, Gjerstad, a village in Gjerstad municipality in Aust-Agder county, Norway
Fiane, Tvedestrand, a village in Tvedestrand municipality in Aust-Agder county, Norway